Babafemi is a given name. It may refer to:

Oluwole Babafemi Familoni (born 1957), Nigerian university professor
Babafemi Ogundipe (1924–1971), Nigerian politician
Babafemi Ojudu (born 1961), Nigerian journalist and politician